The Clinton String Quartet is a string quartet based in the Syracuse, New York area. Active for over 15 years, their most prominent works have been the debuts of many 20th century classical recordings with the Syracuse Society for New Music. All four members are also members of the Syracuse Symphony Orchestra.

About
In addition to their regular concert performances the Quartet performs for commercial and municipal black tie affairs and private events. In recent years the Quartet has been featured in concert at Syracuse University, Colgate University, Cornell University, LeMoyne College, Hamilton College, the Oneida Community Mansion House, Munson-Williams Proctor Institute, WCNY's Spring Serenades and performs regularly with the Syracuse Society for New Music. Some of these programs have been broadcast over WCNY-FM. Through the Syracuse Society for New Music, the Quartet has given world and local premiers of works by many Central New York Classical Music composers.

The Quartet has also provided entertainment as part of Syracuse's Winterfest, Onondaga County Parks Department's "Summer Parks Concerts", "Canal Days Celebration" (Little Falls, NY) and numerous other community and private events. The Quartet has recorded radio and television commercials for several Central New York businesses and was recently selected by author Bruce Coville to record the sound track for his children's book, Jeremy Thatcher, Dragon Hatcher.

The Clinton String Quartet has premiered many works by composers residing in upstate New York, includesing Howard Boatwright, Joseph Downing, Daniel Godfrey, Ann Silsby, Sidney Hodkinson, Samuel Pellman, Robert Palmer, Malcolm Lewis and the late Brian Israel. Most of these concerts have been presented under the auspices of the Syracuse Society for New Music.

Members 
 Violinist Michael Bosetti studied at the University of Michigan and the New England Conservatory, where he received a diploma in performance. His principal teachers were Jamie Laredo, Louis Krasner, and Mihail Stolarevsky. Before joining the Syracuse Symphony Orchestra, Mr. Bosetti performed as assistant concertmaster with orchestras in West Virginia and Nova Scotia, and as first violinist with the Nova String Quartet.  Mr. Bosetti served as assistant principal second violin with the North Carolina Symphony for the 1999 - 2000 season.
 Violinist Vladimir Pritsker is the newest member of the Quartet. Mr. Pritsker emigrated from his home town of Kharkov, Ukraine to the United States in 1989 and became a member of the Syracuse Symphony Orchestra in that same year. While in Ukraine, Mr. Pritsker studied with Professor Adolf Leschinsky at the Kharkov Institute of Arts. His professional career in Ukraine included performances as associate concertmaster of the Kharkov State Opera Theater Orchestra and later as a first violinist with the Kharkov Philharmonic Orchestra. Since moving to Syracuse, Mr. Pritsker has performed with the Skaneateles Festival, Civic Morning Musicals, Glimmerglass Opera Festival, Society for New Music and was a featured soloist with the Syracuse Symphony in October 1991 performing Wieniawski's Fantasie brillante on themes from Faust.  More recently Mr. Pritsker has been engaged by the Lake Placid Chamber Orchestra and teaches violin at Hamilton College in Clinton, New York.
 Violist Kit Dodd received his Bachelor of Music degree from the University of Oregon and attended Wichita State University where he received a Master of Music degree. His principal teachers were G. Roy Mann (University of Oregon) and Jeffrey K. Irvine (Wichita State University). Before moving to Syracuse, Mr. Dodd performed as assistant principal violist with the Eugene Symphony Orchestra and the Wichita Symphony Orchestra. Mr. Dodd has been featured as soloist with the Syracuse Symphony and as chamber soloist with the Society for New Music, Skaneateles Festival and the Syracuse Camerata.  Mr. Dodd currently serves as a violist and Assistant Librarian with the Syracuse Symphony Orchestra.   Mr. Dodd is the newest member of the Onondaga Community College string staff beginning in the fall of 1999 and teaches violin, viola, string repertory and conducts the string ensemble.
 Cellist George Macero attended Queens College and New York University, where he studied the cello with Nathan Stutch, Assistant Principal Cellist of the New York Philharmonic. Mr. Macero performed the Beethoven Triple Concerto as the winner of the Queens concerto competition in New York. He has been a member of the Syracuse Symphony Orchestra since moving to Syracuse in 1977. Mr. Macero has performed as a soloist with the SSO, as well as playing as a regular soloist and chamber musician with the Society for New Music. He is a founding member of the Clinton String Quartet and has recently performed in Rome, Italy, and New York City for American Academy programs. Mr. Macero has taught Cello at Onondaga Community College since 1989.

Discography
CQ1 includes the Baroque era pieces Pachelbel's "Canon" and Bach's "Air" and the Romantic era pieces "American" quartet by Dvořák, "Nocturne" by Borodin, and Edvard Grieg's "Wedding Day at Troldhaugen".

Trivia 
The first time the quartet played together, in 1982, they were without a name. The Quartet's first employer needed to introduce the group and needed a name immediately. The wife of the then second violinist suggested "Clinton" in deference to Dewitt Clinton, Governor of the State of New York from 1817-1823 and 1825-1828.  Governor Clinton was responsible for the building of the Erie Canal and was an avid supporter of the Arts.

References

External links
 The Clinton String Quartet Official website (used as reference)
 SyracuseArts.net Allows searching for upcoming Clinton String Quartet performances

American string quartets
Culture of Syracuse, New York
Musical groups established in 1982
1982 establishments in New York (state)